Stevenson Island is a small, uninhabited island in Yellowstone Lake, Teton County, Wyoming.  It was originally called Stevenson's Island after Colonel James D. Stevenson, and is now sometimes called Stevensons Island.

The island is long and narrow, lying in a generally north–south orientation.

See also
List of islands of Wyoming

References

Lake islands of Wyoming
Landforms of Teton County, Wyoming
Uninhabited islands of the United States